Peter Miller may refer to:

Peter Miller (musician) (born 1942), English singer, songwriter and record producer
Peter Miller (Australian footballer) (born 1969), Australian rules footballer
Peter Miller (actor) (born 1969), Canadian actor
Peter Miller (footballer, born 1858) (1858–1914), Scotland international active in the 1880s
Peter Miller (footballer, born 1908) (1908–1979), Scottish football (soccer) player
Peter Miller (footballer, born 1929) (1929–2012), English footballer
Peter Miller (software engineer) (1960–2014), Australian software developer
Peter N. Miller (born 1964), American intellectual historian
Peter Miller (angler), professional angler
Peter Miller (horse trainer) (born 1966), American horse racing trainer
P. Schuyler Miller (1912–1974), American science fiction writer and critic
Peter G. Miller, American journalist and author
Peter Miller (artist) (1913–1996)

See also
Peter Miller Cunningham (1789–1864), Scottish naval surgeon and pioneer in Australia
Peter Millar (disambiguation)